Sharon Tregenza (née Rosewall) is a British author of children's books, stories and verse. She was born and grew up in Penzance, Cornwall. Her work, often described as mystery with a touch of magic, has been published and broadcast worldwide.

Personal life
Tregenza travelled widely with her husband and two children, living for many years in Cyprus, Dubai and Sharjah, where she worked in the library of the American School of Dubai and then taught conversational English to local girls before returning to the United Kingdom to study at the University of Bristol.

After moving to Pembrokeshire, she completed her MA in creative writing at the University of Wales Trinity Saint David and more recently acquired a second MA in writing for young people at Bath Spa University.

Tregenza is a member of The Society of Authors, The Scattered Authors Society, Society of Children's Book Writers and Illustrators and the Children’s Book Insider.

Tregenza now lives, and writes, in a converted chapel in the village of Box, just outside the historic city of Bath.

Awards & Prizes
 Calderdale Best Children’s Book of the Year, 2018, for Jewelled Jaguar
 Fantastic Book Award
 East Sussex Children's Book
 Kelpie's Prize, for Tarantula Tide
 Heart of Hawick Award 
 Tir Na n-Og Welsh Children's Book Award (twice), 2018, shortlisted for Jewelled Jaguar
 North Somerset Teacher's Book Award (twice), shortlisted

Books

Tarantula Tide
Published 16 October 2008 by Floris,

In August 2008, Sharon won Floris Books' Kelpies Prize 2008 Award at the Edinburgh Book Festival. As a result, the book she submitted, Tarantula Tide, about young sleuths in Shetland, was published by Floris, on 16 October 2008. The book also received the Heart of Hawick Children's Book Award, voted for by schoolchildren, in 2010.

The Shiver Stone
Published 2014 by FIrefly Press, Illustrated by Xavier Bonet, cover design Zoe Draws Things. The Shiver Stone is a middle-grade thriller set in a coastal town in Pembrokeshire, South Wales.

The Jewelled Jaguar
Published 15 September 2017 by FIrefly Press, illustrated by Xavier Bonet, cover design Zoe Draws Things.

Stargazey Pie 
'Oxford Reading Tree Word Sparks: Level 8: Stargazey Pie - Oxford Reading Tree Word Sparks'

Published 26th Oct 2020

Family
In 2020, Tregenza's son helped compose the soundtrack for the award-winning video game Cyberpunk 2077 which sold 13.7 million copies in its first 3 weeks of release.

References

External links

Author's website
Author's Amazon page
Twitter
Facebook
Floris Books
Review of Tarantula Tide

1951 births
Alumni of the University of Bristol
Alumni of the University of Wales
Living people
People from Penzance
British children's writers